M. Prabhaharan is an Indian Film Art Director, Production Designer and Director who completed his degree course in Fine Arts at Government College of Fine Arts, Chennai. He had a brief stint as an illustrator in Special Effects Venky's office in 1990 and then worked as an assistant Art Director under the noted Art Director, Mr. Ashok Kumar in Tamil and Telugu film industry for a few years. He got a big break in 1995 when he was offered to do art direction for R. Parthiepan's movie Pulla Kuttikaran, for which he received the award for Best Art Direction from Tamil Nadu Govt. He did art direction for many Tamil movies, to name a few, Ullathai Allitha, Thulladha Manamum Thullum, Thirupaachi, Anbe Sivam, Virumaandi, Dasavathaaram, Majaa, Vishwa Thulasi, Tenaliraman and Bairavaa.

Awards 

 1995 - Tamil Nadu Govt. State Award for Pullakuttikaran
 1996 - Ajantha Award for Sundara Purushan
 1997 - Priya Cultural Academy Award for V.I.P
 2001 - Tamil Nadu Govt. State Award for Poovellam Un Vasam
 2001 - Pace Award for Poovellam Un Vasam
 2001 - Variety Award for Poovellam Un Vasam
 2002 - Sica Awards for Anbe Sivam
 2002 - Medimix Dinakaran Award for Anbe Sivam
 2002 - V. Shantaram Award for Anbe Sivam
 2008 - Vikatan Award for Dasavathaaram
 2008 - Vijay Award for Dasavathaaram

Filmography

Non-credited films

Director/ Producer

References 

Living people
1966 births
Indian art directors